The Capture of the Bahamas took place in April 1783, late in the American Revolutionary War, when a Loyalist expedition under the command of Andrew Deveaux set out to retake the Bahamas from the Spanish. The expedition was successful and Nassau fell without a shot being fired.  It was one of the last actions of the entire war.

Background 
The Bahamas had been taken by Spanish forces in May 1782. However Saint Augustine in East Florida was still in British hands, the Spanish thinking it too well defended to attack. A plan was devised to retake the Bahamas by launching an attack on Nassau. Andrew Deveaux was a Loyalist and veteran of the Southern theater of the American Revolutionary War.

Recapture 
Major Deveaux departed from Saint Augustine with seventy followers and was joined at sea two days later by the 26-gun privateer brigantine Perseverance of Thomas Dow and the 16-gun, 120-man brigantine Whitby Warrior of Daniel Wheeler. The expedition anchored off Harbour Island and Eleuthera on 6 April, recruiting another 170 volunteers for an attempt against the Spanish garrison at New Providence.

Four days later the sloop Flor de Mayo reached New Providence with a message from the governor of Cuba Luis de Unzaga, saying that peace preliminaries had been signed back in Europe and that the Bahamas were to be restored to British rule in exchange for East Florida.

When Deveaux's flotilla drew near to New Providence on 13 April, the Spanish commander Claraco mistook it for smugglers. His customs patrols were surprised at dawn the following morning to find a heavily armed landing party storming ashore to occupy Fort Montagu and three guardboats. Claraco retreated into his citadel and a brief ceasefire was arranged; Deveaux rescinded it next day. The Spaniards scuttled their remaining warships on 16 April and huddled within the main fort, before deciding to surrender it two days later.

Aftermath 
Over 600 Spaniards surrendered, and 50 cannon and seven ships were captured. Some of the ships that had been scuttled were later refloated and the Spaniards were repatriated to Cuba.

By this time, Britain had already given up East Florida in exchange for the Bahamas in the preliminary talks of the Treaty of Paris. As a reward for his efforts in the Bahamas, Deveaux was given a large portion of Cat Island, where he built a mansion at Port Howe, the remains of which can be seen today.

References

Bibliography 
 Chartrand, Rene. American Loyalist Troops 1775-84 (Men-at-Arms Series). Osprey Publishing (2008). 
 Craton, Michael, and Gail Saunders. Islanders in the Stream: A History of the Bahamian People: Volume 1: From Aboriginal Times to the End of Slavery. University of Georgia Press (1999). 
 Marley, David. Wars of the Americas: A Chronology of Armed Conflict in the New World, 1492 to the Present. ABC-CLIO (1998). 

Conflicts in 1783
Battles involving Great Britain
Battles of the Anglo-Spanish War (1779–1783)
Naval battles of the American Revolutionary War
Battles involving Spain
Battles and conflicts without fatalities
Capture
Capture